KCEI (90.1 FM) is an American radio station licensed to serve the community of Red River, New Mexico. The station's broadcast license is held by Cultural Energy. KCEI also serves Taos, New Mexico, via a booster station (KCEI-FM1) located in the suburb of El Prado.

KCEI broadcasts a variety format to northern New Mexico and southern Colorado.

The station was assigned the call sign "KCEI" by the Federal Communications Commission (FCC) on May 1, 2012. It held the call sign "KRDR" from January 14, 1997, through April 4, 2012. From April 4 to May 1, 2012, the station was licensed as "KCEY".

Booster
KCEI programming is also carried on a booster station to extend or improve the coverage area of the station.

See also
List of community radio stations in the United States

References

External links
KCEI official website

CEI
Radio stations established in 1997
Taos County, New Mexico
Community radio stations in the United States